Nyctanolis is a monotypic genus of salamanders in the family Plethodontidae. It is represented by the species Nyctanolis pernix, also commonly referred to as nimble long-limbed salamander, which is characterized by its absence of lungs; it instead achieves respiration through its skin and the tissues lining the mouth. It is found in Guatemala and Mexico. Its natural habitat is subtropical or tropical moist montane forests. It is threatened by habitat loss.

References

External links
 Frost, Darrel R. 2007. Amphibian Species of the World: an Online Reference. Version 5.2 (15 July 2008). Nyctanolis. Electronic Database accessible at http://research.amnh.org/herpetology/amphibia/index.php. American Museum of Natural History, New York, USA. (Accessed: August 1, 2008). 
 AmphibiaWeb: Information on amphibian biology and conservation. 2008. Berkeley, California: Nyctanolis. AmphibiaWeb, available at http://amphibiaweb.org/. (Accessed: August 1, 2008).

Plethodontidae
Amphibians described in 1983
Taxa named by David B. Wake
Taxonomy articles created by Polbot
Monotypic amphibian genera